Stanislav Vyacheslavovych Morarenko (born 3 August 2001) is a Ukrainian professional footballer who plays as a central midfielder.

References

External links
 Profile on Podillya Khmelnytskyi official website
 
 

2001 births
Living people
Ukrainian footballers
Association football midfielders
FC Chornomorets Odesa players
FC Tyras-2500 Bilhorod-Dnistrovskyi players
FC Kolos Kovalivka players
FC Podillya Khmelnytskyi players
FC Dinaz Vyshhorod players
Ukrainian First League players
Ukrainian Second League players
Sportspeople from Odesa Oblast